St. John the Baptist Church is a historic church at 31925 Lacroix Road in Dorseyville, Iberville Parish, Louisiana.

It was added to the National Register of Historic Places in 1994.

References

External links
 St. John the Baptist Church website

Baptist churches in Louisiana
Churches on the National Register of Historic Places in Louisiana
Buildings and structures in Iberville Parish, Louisiana
National Register of Historic Places in Iberville Parish, Louisiana